A pilgrimage is a long journey or search of great moral significance.

Pilgrimage may also refer to:

Film 
 Pilgrimage (1933 film), a 1933 film by John Ford
 Pilgrimage (2001 film), a 2001 film by Werner Herzog 
 Pilgrimage (2017 film), a 2017 film directed by Brendan Muldowney

Literature 
 The Pilgrimage (O Diário de Um Mago), a novel by Paulo Coelho
 Al-Hajj (“The Pilgrimage”), the twenty-second sura of the Qur'an 
 Pilgrimage (novel sequence), a sequence of novels by Dorothy Richardson
 Pilgrimage (Peregrinação), an autobiography by Fernão Mendes Pinto
 Pilgrimage: The Book of the People, a novel by Zenna Henderson

Music 
 Pilgrimage (Larry Gatlin album)
 Pilgrimage (Michael Brecker album)
 Pilgrimage (Om album)
 Pilgrimage (Wishbone Ash album)
 The Pilgrimage (album), 2011 album by Cappadonna
 Pilgrimage, a solo cantata composed by Carlisle Floyd
 “Pilgrimage”, a song by Conjure One from Extraordinary Ways
 “Pilgrimage”, a song by Nine Inch Nails from The Fragile
 “Pilgrimage”, a song by R.E.M. from Murmur
 “Pilgrimage”, a song by Suzanne Vega from Days of Open Hand
 Pilgrimage Music & Cultural Festival

Other uses 
Great Pilgrimage or Women's Suffrage Pilgrimage, march in England and Wales in 1913
 Pilgrimage (demo party), an annual demoscene party in Salt Lake City, Utah
 Pilgrimage (horse), a racehorse
 Pilgrimage (TV series)